Chakhmaq (flint) may refer to:
 Chakhmaq, Razavi Khorasan
 Chakhmaq, West Azerbaijan